The 2012 European Junior Cup was the second season of the European Junior Cup. It was contested on equal KTM 690 Duke bikes. Lukas Wimmer won the title.

Entry list

Race calendar and results

Championship standings

References 

European Junior Cup